High Desert is a master-planned community built by High Desert Investment Corporation in the Far Northeast Heights of Albuquerque, New Mexico. The boundaries of the High Desert neighborhood are Tramway Blvd. to the west, Simms Park Road to the north, the Sandia Mountains to the east, and Bear Canyon Open Space to the south.
The High Desert area is one of the most expensive areas of Albuquerque. High Desert is also one of the most highly elevated neighborhoods in Albuquerque, as most of the neighborhood is at or above  in elevation. High Desert is zoned to Georgia O'Keeffe Elementary School, Eisenhower Middle School, and Eldorado High School.

Layout 
There are 23 subdivisions of homes located within High Desert. Some of the subdivisions consist of homes on estates that are typically  or more. The estate subdivisions of High Desert are located to the east of High Desert Street, and to the north and east of Blue Grama Road/Imperata Street.

External links
High Desert Residential Owners Association

Geography of Albuquerque, New Mexico
Planned communities in the United States